Maianthemum amoenum is a perennial flowering plant, growing as an epiphyte on trees in cloud forests from Mexico south to Honduras.

Description
Roots grow scattered evenly along densely clumped, rounded rhizomes.

Leaves
Leaves usually clasp the stalk; some may have a short ( long) petiole. Leaf blades are egg-shaped with pointed tips and veins are prominent. The leaf surface is hairless and shiny.

Flowering clusters
25 to 75 flowers are set on a branched flowering stalk (panicle). The main axis of the panicle is usually 4-6 cm long, stiff and straight. It is hairless and often red or with red patches. The side branches of the panicle are short (1-2 cm long) and arranged in a helix. They start off ascending, but become spreading as the flowers bloom. Each side branch has 3-5 flowers, with one flower set close to the base of the branch and the others set on 1-2 cm long stalks (pedicels) at about 4mm intervals along the branch.

Flowers and fruits
The flowers are cup-shaped and made up of lavender to pink-white tepals up to 6.5 mm long with stamens inserted at the base. Fruits are rounded to 3-lobed, 5-8mm across, green ripening to red. Flowering occurs from January to April and fruits remain on the plant into October.

Distribution
It has been found in El Salvador, Guatemala (the Totonicapán area), Honduras and in the Veracruz, Oaxaca, Chiapas states of Mexico.

Habitat and ecology
Maianthemum amoenum usually grows as an epiphyte on canopy trees of the cloud forest at 2300 - 3300 m elevation. Plants are usually found  or more above the ground, but sometimes persist in blow-downs. They can form dense clumps covering canopy trees such as Quercus and Drimys.

References

amoenum
Flora of Chiapas
Flora of Oaxaca
Flora of Veracruz
Flora of Honduras
Flora of Guatemala
Flora of El Salvador